Statistics of Swedish football Division 1 in season 1997.

Overview
It was contested by 28 teams, and Hammarby IF and Västra Frölunda IF won the championship.

Vasalunds IF was awarded technical losses in nine matches due to using four non-EU-players per match (among them Jones Kusi-Asare), one more than the allowed three.

League standings

Norra

Södra

Footnotes

References
Sweden - List of final tables (Clas Glenning)

1997
2
Sweden
Sweden